Gregory King Hoblit (born November 27, 1944) is an American film director, television director and television producer. He is best known for directing the films Primal Fear, Fallen, Frequency, Hart's War, Fracture, and Untraceable. He has won nine Primetime Emmy Awards for directing and producing Hill Street Blues, NYPD Blue, L.A. Law, Hooperman and the television film Roe vs. Wade.

Hoblit was born in Abilene, Texas, the son of Elizabeth Hubbard King and Harold Foster Hoblit, an FBI agent. Much of Hoblit's work is oriented towards police, attorneys and legal cases.

Hoblit has directed and produced the pilot and series of such acclaimed television series such as NYPD Blue, L.A. Law and Hill Street Blues. He also wrote an episode of the latter series. Hoblit received Primetime Emmy Awards for his directing of the pilot episodes of Hooperman and L.A. Law. In 1981, he won in the category Outstanding Drama Series, which he won along with Steven Bochco and Michael Kozoll.

He was married to actress Debrah Farentino from 1994 to 2009. They have one child together.

Filmography

References

External links

1944 births
Living people
American television directors
Television producers from Texas
Film directors from Texas
People from Abilene, Texas
Primetime Emmy Award winners
Directors Guild of America Award winners